Ms. Hammurabi is a 2018 South Korean television series written by Moon Yoo-seok, the chief judge of Seoul Eastern District Court, and starring Go Ara, Kim Myung-soo, and Sung Dong-il. It is based on the screenwriter's own novel of the same name, which was first serialized in 2015 on The Hankyoreh and was later published in paperback form in 2016 by Munhakdongne Publishing Group. It aired on JTBC's Mondays and Tuesdays at 23:00 (KST) time slot from May 21 to July 16, 2018 for 16 episodes.<ref>{{cite web|url=http://kpopherald.koreaherald.com/view.php?ud=201805211708149051052_2|title=Miss Hammurabi' to search for warmhearted justice|date=May 21, 2018|website=Kpop Herald}}</ref>

The series was well-received by viewers for its fresh perspective on judges, as well as its honest depiction of adversities in modern-day Korean society.

Synopsis
The series tells the story of the life of judges and the various disputes that they have to settle.

Cast
Main
 Go Ara as Park Cha Oh-reum, a passionate and idealistic rookie judge who stays by her beliefs and stands for justice.
 Kim Myung-soo as Lim Ba-reun, an elite judge who prioritizes principles and sticks to the rules.
 Sung Dong-il as Han Se-sang, a down-to-earth chief judge with years of experience and knowledge who understands the harsh realities of life.
 Ryu Deok-hwan as Jung Bo-wang, an elite judge from Department 43, beside Department 44, who knows almost everything about everyone. 
 Lee Elijah as Lee Do-yeon, a stenographer for Department 44 who has a secret nighttime job.

Supporting
 Lee Tae-sung as Min Yong-joon
 Lee Jae-woo as Judge Cheon Seong-hoon	
 Ahn Nae-sang as Chief presiding judge
 Cha Soon-bae as Sung Gong-choong
 Lee Won-jong as Bae Gong-dae
 Kim Hong-fa as Chief Judge
 Lee Cheol-min as Maeng Sa-sung 
 Yum Ji-young as Yoon Ji-young
 Lee Yea-eun as Lee Dan-di 
 Kim Bo-yoon as Han Seo-yeon
 Kim Ji-sung as Kim Da-in
 Kim Hyun as Park Cha-oh Reum's aunt
 Kim Young-ok as Oh-reum's grandmother
 Park Sun-cheon as Lim Ba-reum's mother 
 Ko In-beom as Lim Ba-reum's father
 Cha Soo-yeon as Hong Eun-ji
 Lee Kan-hee as Park Cha Oh-reum's mother
 Hong Hee-woon as Lawyer Go Jin-tae
 Kim Wook as Lee Ga-on
 Son Ji-yoon as Lee Myung-soo's wife

Production
 Ms. Hammurabi was planned to be 100% pre-produced.
 This series reunites Sung Dong-il and Go Ara who previously worked together in Reply 1994 (2013) and Hwarang: The Poet Warrior Youth'' (2016).
 The first script reading of the cast was held on January 16, 2018.

Original soundtrack

Part 1

Part 2

Part 3

Part 4

Part 5

Viewership

Awards and nominations

References

External links
  
 
 

Korean-language television shows
JTBC television dramas
2018 South Korean television series debuts
2018 South Korean television series endings
South Korean legal television series
South Korean pre-produced television series
Television shows based on South Korean novels
Television series by Next Entertainment World